Nginda is a settlement in Kenya's Coast Province.

Populated places in Coast Province